This Joe Cocker discography lists the recordings plus live appearances of John Robert "Joe" Cocker, OBE (20 May 1944 – 22 December 2014), the English rock/blues musician, composer and actor who came to popularity in the 1960s, and was most known for his gritty voice, his idiosyncratic arm movements while performing, and his cover versions of popular songs, particularly those of The Beatles.

He received several awards, including a 1983 Grammy Award for his song "Up Where We Belong", a duet which he performed with Jennifer Warnes. He was ranked No. 97 on Rolling Stones 100 greatest singers list.

Albums

Studio

Live

Official compilations

Other albums 
 1967 Rag Goes Mad at the Mojo (EP compilation with two songs by Joe Cocker's Big Blues)
 1987 Unchain My Heart (EP, remix & live)
 1988 The 12 Mixes (mini-LP)
 1997 Special Beck's Edition
 2015 Joe Cocker in Interview with Robin Ross

Video/DVD 
 1970 Woodstock: 3 Days of Peace & Music (motion picture)
 1971 Joe Cocker, Mad Dogs & Englishmen (motion picture) (DVD – 2005)
 1986 Joe Cocker Music Video
 1990 A Tribute to John Lennon – Live ("Isolation")
 1992 The Best of Joe Cocker Live (Dortmund, Germany, 1992) (DVD – 2006)
 1994 Have A Little Faith (biography)
 1997 Joe Cocker Live: Across From Midnight Tour (Germany, 1997) (DVD – 2004)
 2001 Joe Cocker in Concert (Germany, 1996)
 2002 Joe Cocker Live (Italy, 1981)
 2002 Party at the Palace (London, 2002, "With a Little Help from My Friends", "All You Need Is Love")
 2003 Joe Cocker (DVD EP)
 2004 Joe Cocker Live: Across from Midnight Tour (Waldbuhne, Berlin, Germany, 1997)
 2004 The Best of Joe Cocker Live (Dortmund, Germany, 1992, and Cologne, Germany, 2002)
 2005 Feeling Alright*
 2005 Respect Yourself Live
 2005 Live at Montreux 1987
 2008 Cry Me A River (Rockpalast, 1983)

Notable guest appearances 
 1970 Leon Russell – Leon Russell (backing vocals)
 1971 Delaney & Bonnie – Motel Shot
 1973 Silverhead – 16 and Savaged (backing vocals)
 1974 John Lee Hooker – Free Beer and Chicken ("Five Long Years", "The Stratch")
 1976 Bo Diddley – 20th Anniversary of Rock n' Roll (backing vocals)
 1981 The Crusaders – Standing Tall ("I'm So Glad I'm Standing Here Today", "This Old World's Too Funky For Me")
 1982 An Officer and a Gentleman Original Motion Picture Soundtrack ("Up Where We Belong", with Jennifer Warnes)
 1984 Teachers Original Motion Picture Soundtrack ("Edge of a Dream")
 1986 Wildcats Original Motion Picture Soundtrack ("We Stand Alone")
 1986  Original Motion Picture Soundtrack ("Now that you're gone")
 1987 Harry and the Hendersons Original Motion Picture Soundtrack ("Love Lives On")
 1989 James Brown & Friends – Soul Session Live ("When a Man Loves a Woman", "I'll Go Crazy")
 1989 Yes We Can – Artists United for Nature (charity single)
 1991 Two Rooms: Celebrating the Songs of Elton John & Bernie Taupin ("Sorry Seems to Be the Hardest Word")
 1992 The Cutting Edge Original Motion Picture Soundtrack ("Feels Like Forever")
 1993 Jimmy Barnes – Flesh and Wood ("Guilty")
 1994 Grammy's Greatest Moments Volume III (live version of "Up Where We Belong" with Jennifer Warnes)
 1995 Sol En Si – Solidarité Enfants Sida ("Ain't No Sunshine")
 1997 B. B. King – Deuces Wild ("Dangerous Mood")
 1998 Eros Ramazzotti – Eros Live ("That's All I Need To Know")
 1999 Pavarotti & Friends for Guatemala and Kosovo ("You Are So Beautiful")
 1999 Tim Hinkley – Hinkley's Heroes Vol. 1 ("Saturday Blues")
 1999 It's Only Rock 'N' Roll – Various Artists for Children's Promise (charity single)
 2001 Otis Thompson – Rebirth
 2002 Al Jarreau – All I Got ("Lost and Found")
 2002 Lulu – Together ("Now That The Magic Has Gone")
 2007 Across the Universe – Original Motion Picture Soundtrack ("Come Together")
 2010 Santana – Guitar Heaven: The Greatest Guitar Classics of All Time ("Little Wing")
 2013 Jimmy Webb – Still Within the Sound of My Voice ("The Moon's a Harsh Mistress")

Singles 

 (1988) "Don't You Love Me Anymore" was not released in the UK until June 1988

References 

Discography
Blues discographies
Discographies of British artists
Rhythm and blues discographies
Rock music discographies